The 2003 Rother District Council election took place on 1 May 2003 to elect members of Rother District Council in East Sussex, England. The whole council was up for election after boundary changes reduced the number of seats by 7. The Conservative Party stayed in overall control of the council.

Background
Originally a total of 81 candidates stood for the 37 seats that were to be elected after the boundary changes, comprising 37 Conservatives, 32 Liberal Democrats, 12 Labour and 3 independents. However the death of a Liberal Democrat candidate for Rother Levels meant the election in that ward was delayed until 12 June and so 75 candidates stood for the 35 seats that were contested on 1 May.

Both the Conservative leader of East Sussex County Council, Peter Jones, and the leader of the Liberal Democrat group on Rother District Council, Stephen Hardy, stood down from the council at the election.

Election result
The Conservatives continued to hold a strong majority on the council winning 13 of the 18 seats in Bexhill, compared to 2 each for the Liberal Democrat and Labour parties, and 1 independent. In the remaining rural areas of the council that were elected on 1 May, 9 Conservatives, 6 Liberal Democrats, 1 Labour and 1 independent councillors were elected.

The delayed election in Rother Levels on 12 June had the Conservatives win both seats.

The above totals include the delayed election in Rother Levels on 12 June 2003.

Ward results

Rother Levels delayed election
The election in Rother Levels was delayed until 12 June 2003 after the death of a Liberal Democrat candidate Julian Emery.

By-elections between 2003 and 2007

Bexhill Sackville September 2004
A by-election took place in Bexhill Sackville on 9 September 2004 after the resignation of Conservative councillor Jean Hopkinson when she moved to New Zealand. The seat was held for the Conservatives by Graham Oliver with a majority of 184 votes over the Liberal Democrats.

Bexhill St Stephens
A by-election was held in Bexhill St Stephens on 29 September 2005 after the death of Conservative councillor William Clements. The seat was held for the Conservatives by Paul Lendon by a majority of 111 votes over the Liberal Democrats.

Ticehurst and Etchingham
A by-election was held in Ticehurst and Etchingham on 17 November 2005 after Conservative councillor John Potter moved away. The seat was held for the Conservatives by Robert Elliston with a majority of 367 votes over the Liberal Democrats.

Bexhill Kewhurst
A by-election was held in Bexhill Kewhurst on 4 May 2006 after Conservative councillor Martin Horscroft resigned from the council. The seat was held for the Conservatives by Martin Kenward with a majority of 616 votes over the Liberal Democrats.

Bexhill Sackville May 2006
A by-election was held in Bexhill Sackville on 4 May 2006 after Conservative councillor Graham Oliver resigned from the council. The seat was held for the Conservatives by Keith Standring with a majority of 89 votes over the Liberal Democrats.

Bexhill St Marks
A by-election was held in Bexhill St Marks on 4 May 2006 after Conservative councillor Stuart Earl resigned from the council. The seat was held for the Conservatives by Patrick Douart with a majority of 325 votes over the Liberal Democrats.

References

2003
2003 English local elections
2000s in East Sussex